Shekar Estalkh (also Romanized as Shekār Esţalkh) is a village in Howmeh Rural District, in the Central District of Rasht County, Gilan Province, Iran. At the 2006 census, its population was 430, in 113 families.

References 

Populated places in Rasht County